Sakhalin Railway is one of the railway division under Far Eastern Railway that primarily serves in Sakhalin Island. Due to its island location, the railway becomes the second isolated 1520mm gauge network in Russia, like the Norilsk railway. The only main connection to the mainland is the Vanino–Kholmsk train ferry. The management is located at Yuzhno-Sakhalinsk.

History

The Treaty of Portsmouth following the Russo-Japanese War of 1904-05 placed the northern half of Sakhalin under the control of the Russian Empire, whilst the southern half (Karafuto) was under control of Japan.

In 1911, a  branch was built from Yuzhno-Sakhalinsk to Starodubskoye (Sakaehama). Between 1918 and 1921, the towns of Nevelsk, Kholmsk, Chekhov and Tomari were also connected to the network. The Japanese railway network consisted of the Western Karafuto Railway from Naihoro (Gornozavodsk) to Tomarioru, and the Eastern Karafuto Railways from Otomari to Koton (Pobedino) until 1944.

After the Second World War, control of the whole of the island passed to the Soviet Union, including the island's complete rail network and rolling stock. Wagons from the Soviet railways were re-gauged for use on the island.  The locomotive factory in Lyudinovo produced diesel locomotives of the models TG16 and TG21 specifically for use on the island's narrow gauge network. Additionally, trains were imported from Japan, such as the purpose-made A1 sets made by Hitachi Rail and Teikoku Sharyo (1958-1960), followed by the D2 sets made by Fuji Heavy Industries (1986) and ex-JNR KiHa 58 railcars, purchased second hand in the early 1990s.

In 1992, the Sakhalin Railway was split from the Far Eastern Railway and made its own administrative entity. It reverted to being part of the Far Eastern Railway in 2010.

In order to allow regular Russian trains to run on the island, the island's rail network underwent conversion to Russian broad gauge starting from 2003. Russian Railways formally completed the regauging work in August 2019. Last scheduled train on 1067mm line Holmsk-77km pk9  was run at 30.09.2020.

Future prospects

Potential connection to the mainland

The Soviet Union under Joseph Stalin planned to construct a tunnel between Sakhalin and the Russian mainland, which would have linked Sakhalin to the rest of the Soviet rail network.  The project was begun using forced labor between 1950 and 1953 but was canceled after Stalin's death.

Since 1973, a train ferry has connected Vanino (on the mainland near Sovetskaya Gavan) with the town of Kholmsk on Sakhalin.

There have been some calls from politicians to revive the concept of building a bridge or tunnel between Sakhalin and the mainland, although there have been concerns that the costs of the project would outweigh the benefits. However, Russian President Dimitry Medvedev announced his support for the project in November 2008, suggesting the link could be completed by 2030, with bridge rather than a tunnel, and far more northerly route. In February 2013, the Russian government announced plans to build the link, including it in the 2012–2015 federal transport plan. It would connect the Sakhalin Railway to the Baikal–Amur Mainline at Komsomolsk-on-Amur.

Potential connection to Hokkaido

There have also been proposals to connect the southern tip of Sakhalin to the Japanese island of Hokkaido via a  bridge or tunnel.  This link would allow a direct land transport link for container traffic from Japan to the Asian mainland and Europe.

Rolling stock

See also
Bogie exchange
Vanino–Kholmsk train ferry
Sakhalin Tunnel
Sakhalin–Hokkaido Tunnel
Newfoundland Railway: The railway was in a similar situation (until 1988) and remote location.

References

External links

 Russian Railways Official Site (Russian language)
 Sakhalin Railway Official Site (Russian language)
 Photo - project «Steam Engine» (Russian language)
 «The site of the railroad» S. Bolashenko (Russian language)

Sakhalin
Rail transport in the Russian Far East
Railway lines in Russia
History of rail transport in Japan
3 ft 6 in gauge railways in Russia
1520 mm gauge railways in Russia